The Muisca (also called Chibcha) are an indigenous people and culture of the Altiplano Cundiboyacense, Colombia, that formed the Muisca Confederation before the Spanish conquest. The people spoke Muysccubun, a language of the Chibchan language family, also called Muysca and Mosca. They were encountered by conquistadors dispatched by the Spanish Empire in 1537 at the time of the conquest. Subgroupings of the Muisca were mostly identified by their allegiances to three great rulers: the hoa, centered in Hunza, ruling a territory roughly covering modern southern and northeastern Boyacá and southern Santander; the psihipqua, centered in Muyquytá and encompassing most of modern Cundinamarca, the western Llanos; and the iraca, religious ruler of Suamox and modern northeastern Boyacá and southwestern Santander.

Their territory bordered the lands of the Panche in the west, the Muzo in the northwest, the Guane in the north, the Lache in the northeast, the Achagua in the east, and the Sutagao in the south.

At the time of the Spaniard invasion, the area had a large population, although the precise number of inhabitants is not known. Estimates vary from 500,000 to over 3 million inhabitants. Their economy was based on agriculture, salt mining, trading, metalworking, and manufacturing.

Due to Spanish colonization, the population of the Muisca has drastically decreased and assimilated into the general population. The descendants of the Muisca are often found in rural municipalities including Cota, Chía, Tenjo, Suba, Engativá, Tocancipá, Gachancipá, and Ubaté. A census by the Ministry of Interior Affairs in 2005 reports a total of 14,051 Muisca people in Colombia.

Important contributors to the knowledge about the Muisca have been their main conquistador, Gonzalo Jiménez de Quesada; Spanish poet, soldier, and priest Juan de Castellanos (16th century); bishop Lucas Fernández de Piedrahita and Franciscan Pedro Simón (17th century); and Javier Ocampo López and Gonzalo Correal Urrego (recent).

History of the Muisca 

Knowledge of events up until 1450 is mainly derived from mythological contexts, but thanks to the Chronicles of the West Indies we do have descriptions of the final period of Muisca history, prior to Spanish arrival.

Background 
Excavations in the Altiplano Cundiboyacense (the highlands of Cundinamarca and Boyacá departments) show evidence of human activity since the Archaic stage at the beginning of the Holocene era. Colombia has one of the most ancient archaeological sites of the Americas: El Abra, which is estimated to be approximately 13,000 years old. Other archaeological traces in the region of the Altiplano Cundiboyacense have led scholars to talk about an El Abra Culture: In Tibitó, tools and other lithic artifacts date to 9740 BCE; on the Bogotá savanna, especially at Tequendama Falls, other lithic tools dated a millennium later were found that belonged to specialized hunters. Human skeletons were found that date to 5000 BCE. Analysis demonstrated that the people were members of the El Abra Culture.

Muisca era 
Scholars agree that the group identified as Muisca migrated to the Altiplano Cundiboyacense in the Formative era (between 1000 BCE and 500 CE), as shown by evidence found at Aguazuque and Soacha. Like the other formative-era cultures of America, the Muiscas were transitioning between being hunter-gatherers and becoming sedentary farmers. Around 1500 BCE, groups of agrarians with ceramic traditions came to the region from the lowlands. They had permanent housing and stationary camps, and worked the salty water to extract salt. In Zipacón there is evidence of agriculture and ceramics. The oldest settlement of the highlands dates to 1270 BCE. Between 800 BCE and 500 BCE, a second wave of migrants came to the highlands. Their presence is identified by multicolor ceramics, housing, and farms. These groups were still in residence upon the arrival of the Spanish invaders. They left abundant traces of their occupation that have been studied since the 16th century, and allow scientists to reconstruct their way of life. It is possible that the Muisca integrated with more ancient inhabitants, but the Muisca were the ones who molded the cultural profile and the social and political organization. Their language, a dialect of Chibcha, was very similar to those peoples of the Sierra Nevada de Santa Marta (Kogui, Ijka, Wiwa, and Kankuamo) and the Sierra Nevada del Cocuy (U'wa).

Wars 

Zipa Saguamanchica (ruled 1470 to 1490) was in a constant war against aggressive tribes such as the Sutagao, and especially the Panche, who would also make difficulties for his successors, Nemequene and Tisquesusa. The Caribs were also a permanent threat as rivals of the zaque of Hunza, especially for the possession of the salt mines of Zipaquirá, Nemocón and Tausa.

Timeline of inhabitation of the Muisca area

Political and administrative organization 

The Muisca people were organized in a confederation that was a loose union of states that each retained sovereignty. The confederation was not a kingdom, as there was no absolute monarch, nor was it an empire, because it did not dominate other ethnic groups or peoples. It is hard to compare the Muisca Confederation with other American civilizations, such as the Aztec or the Inca empires. The Muisca Confederation was one of the biggest and best-organized confederations of tribes on the South American continent.

Every tribe within the confederation was ruled by a chief or a cacique. Most of the tribes were part of the Muisca ethnic group, sharing the same language and culture and forming relations through trade. They united in the face of a common enemy. The army was the responsibility of the zipa or zaque. The army was made up of the güeches, the traditional ancient warriors of the Muisca.

The Muisca Confederation existed as the union of two lesser confederations. The southern confederation, headed by the zipa, had its capital at Bacatá (now Bogotá). This southern polity included the majority of the Muisca population and held greater economic power.

The northern territory was ruled by the zaque, and had its capital in Hunza, known today as Tunja. Although both areas had common political relations and affinities and belonged to the same tribal nation, there were still rivalries between them. Among the territories there were four chiefdoms: Bacatá, Hunza, Duitama, and Sogamoso. The chiefdom was composed by localities. The tribes were divided into Capitanías (ruled by a capitan). There were two kinds: Great Capitania (sybyn) and Minor Capitania (uta). The status of Capitan was inherited by maternal lineage.

Confederation (zipa or zaque)
--> Priests (Iraca)
--> Chiefdoms (Cacique)
--> Capitanía (Capitan)
--> Sybyn
--> Uta

 Territories of the zipa:
 Bacatá rule: Teusaquillo, Tenjo, Subachoque, Facatativá, Tabio, Cota, Chía, Engativá, Usme, Zipaquirá, Nemocón and Zipacón
 Fusagasugá District: Fusagasugá, Pasca and Tibacuy
 Ubaté District: Ubaté, Cucunubá, Simijaca, Susa
 Guatavita District: Gachetá, Guatavita and Suesca, Chocontá, Teusacá, Sesquilé, Guasca, Sopó, Usaquén, Tuna, Suba
 Territories of the zaque: 
 Hunza rule: Soracá, Ramiriquí, Samacá, Machetá, Tenza, Tibiritá, Lenguazaque and Turmequé
 Territory of Tundama: Cerinza, Oicatá, Onzaga, Sativanorte, Sativasur, Soatá, Paipa, Tobasia
 Territory of Sugamuxi: Busbanzá, Toca, Pesca, Pisba, Tópaga
 Autonomous chiefdoms: Charalá, Chipatá, Tinjacá, Saboyá, Tacasquirá

The Muisca legislation was consuetudinary, that is to say, their rule of law was determined by long-extant customs with the approval of the zipa or zaque. This kind of legislation was suitable to a confederation system, and it was a well-organized one. The natural resources could not be privatized: woods, lakes, plateaus, rivers and other natural resources were common goods.

Language 

Chibcha, also known as muysca, mosca, or muysca cubun, belongs to the Chibchan languages. It was spoken across several regions of Central America and the north of South America. The Tairona culture and the U'wa, related to the Muisca culture, speak similar languages, which encouraged trade. The Muisca used a form of hieroglyphs for numbers.

Many Chibcha words were absorbed or "loaned" into Colombian Spanish:
 Geography: Many names of localities and regions were kept. In some cases, the Spanish named cities with a combination of Chibcha and Spanish words, such as Santa Fe de Bogotá (Chibcha: "Bacatá"). Most of the municipalities of the Boyacá and Cundinamarca departments are derived from Chibcha names: Chocontá, Sogamoso, Zipaquirá, and many others.
 Fruits, such as curuba and uchuva.
 Relations: the youngest child is called cuba, or china for a girl; muysca means people.

Economy 

The Muisca had an economy and society considered to have been one of the most powerful of the American Post-Classic stage, mainly because of the precious resources of the area: gold and emeralds. When the Spaniards arrived in Muisca territory they found a rich state, with the Muisca Confederation controlling mining of the following products:
 emeralds: Colombia is the primary producer of emeralds in the world
 copper
 coal: the coal mines still operate today at Zipaquirá and other sites. Colombia has some of the world's most significant coal reserves.
 salt: there were mines in production at Nemocón, Zipaquirá, and Tausa
 gold: gold was imported from other regions, but it was so abundant that it became a preferred material for Muisca handicrafts. The many handicraft works in gold and the zipa tradition of offering gold to the goddess Guatavita contributed to the legend of El Dorado.

The Muisca traded their goods at local and regional markets with a system of barter. Items traded ranged from those of basic necessity through to luxury goods. The abundance of salt, emeralds, and coal brought these commodities to de facto currency status.

Having developed an agrarian society, the people used terrace farming and irrigation in the highlands. Main products were fruits, coca, quinoa, yuca and potatoes.

Another major economic activity was weaving. The people made a wide variety of complex textiles. The scholar Paul Bahn said: "the Andean cultures mastered almost every method of textile weaving or decoration now known, and their products were often finer than those of today."

Culture 

The Muisca were an agrarian and ceramic society of the Andes of the north of South America. Their political and administrative organization enabled them to form a compact cultural unity with great discipline. In Spanish, it is called cultura muisca

The contributions of the Muisca culture to the Colombian national identity have been many.

Heraldry 
Pre-Columbian Muisca patterns appear in various seals of modern municipalities located on the Altiplano Cundiboyacense, for instance Sopó and Guatavita, Cundinamarca. The remaining Muisca people in central Colombia also have their own seal.

Sports 
The Muisca culture had certain sports which were part of their rituals. The turmequé game, also known as tejo, has survived and became a popular sport of Colombia. Also important were matches of wrestling. The winner received a finely woven cotton blanket from the chief and was qualified as a guecha warrior.

Religion 

Muisca priests were educated from childhood and led the main religious ceremonies. Only the priests could enter the temples. Besides the religious activities, the priests had much influence in the lives of the people, giving counsel in matters of farming or war. The religion originally included human sacrifice, but the practice may have been extinct by the time of the Spanish conquest, as there are no first-hand Spanish accounts.

Oral tradition suggests that every family gave up a child for sacrifice, that the children were regarded as sacred and cared for until the age of 15, when their lives were then offered to the Sun-god, Sué.

Deities 
 Sué, Suá, Zuhé or Xué (The Sun god): he is the father of the Muisca. His temple was in Suamox, the sacred city of the Sun. He was the most venerated god, especially by the Confederation of the zaque, who was considered his descendant.
 Chía (The Moon-goddess): her temple was in what is today the municipality of Chía. She was widely worshipped by the Confederation of the zipa, who was considered her son.
 Bochica: though not properly a god, he enjoyed the same status as one. He was a chief or hero eternized in the oral tradition. The land was flooded by Huitaca, a beautiful and mean woman, or by Chibchacum, protector of the farmers. Bochica listened to the complaints of the Muisca about floods. With his stick, he broke two rocks at the edge of the Tequendama Falls and all the water came out, forming a waterfall. Bochica punished Huitaca and Chibchacum:  He made Huitaca an owl and made her hold up the sky. Chibchacum was tasked with holding up the Earth.
 Bachué: the mother of the Muisca people. It was said that a beautiful woman with a baby came out of Lake Iguaque. Bachué sat down at the bank of the lake and waited for the child to grow up. When he was old enough, they married and had many children, who were the Muisca. Bachué taught them to hunt, to farm, to respect the laws, and to worship the gods. Bachué was so good and loved that the Muisca referred to her as Furachoque (Good woman in Chibcha). When they became old, Bachué and her husband decided to go back to the deep of the lagoon. That day the Muisca were so sad, but at the same time very happy because they knew their mother was very happy. Other versions of the legend say that after stepping into the lagoon of Iguaque, Bachué ascended to the sky and became Chía; in other versions Chia and Bachué are two different figures.

Astronomy 

The cult of the Muisca centered on two main deities; Sué for the Sun and Chía for the Moon. They developed a vigesimal (based on 20) calendar and knew exactly the timing of the summer solstice (June 21), which they considered the Day of Sué, the Sun god. The Sué temple was in Sogamoso, the sacred city of the Sun and the seat of the Iraca (priest). The Muisca name of the city, Suamox or Sugamuxi, means "City of the Sun". On the solstice, the zaque went to Suamox for a major festival where ritual offerings were made. It was the only day of the year when the zaque showed his face, as he was considered a descendant of the Sun god.

Mythology 

The Muisca mythology is well documented. Many of the writers who contributed to the Chronicles of the West Indies were based in Bogotá. They recorded many of the myths as they were interested in the traditions and culture of the conquered people. The Muisca territory became the seat of the colonial administration for the New Kingdom of Granada (Spanish: Nuevo Reino de Granada).

El Dorado 

The origin of the legend of El Dorado (Spanish for "The Golden One") in the early 16th century may be located in the Muisca Confederation. The zipa offered gold and other treasures to the Guatavita goddess. To do so, the zipa covered himself with gold dust and washed it off in the lake while tossing gold trinkets into the waters. This tradition was well known outside the Confederation, as far as the Caribbean Sea; the Spaniards were attracted by stories of a "city of gold" that did not exist. Indigenous people sometimes got rid of the avaricious Spaniards in that way, pointing them in the direction of other peoples. Lake Guatavita was explored by conquistadors who were looking for gold offerings from the zipa to the goddess. The legend grew until the term became a metaphor for any place where great wealth may be found or made.

Architecture 

The Muisca did not construct large stone structures. They didn't use the abundant rock to leave monumental ruins as has happened with other American cultures. Their houses were built with materials such as clay, canes, and wood. The houses had a conical form, most of them to the point that Gonzalo Jiménez de Quesada, founder of Bogotá, gave the area the name Valle de los Alcázares ("Valley of the Palaces"). The houses had small doors and windows, and the dwellings of the higher rank citizens were different. The Muisca used little furniture as they would typically sit on the floor.

The Spanish conquest 

Rivalries between the zaque and the zipa were taken advantage of by the Spaniards as they conquered the heart of what would be Colombia. Some of them, such as Sebastián de Belalcázar, Gonzalo Jiménez de Quesada, and Nicolás de Federman, interested in locating El Dorado, discovered the rich plains of Cundinamarca and Boyacá. The presence of the Spaniards gave hope to both sovereigns that, were they to make one Confederation, could prevail in a war against the Spaniards. But the Spaniards prevailed.

The reaction of the chief leaders and the people did little to change the destiny of the Confederations. The Spanish executed the last Muisca sovereigns, Sagipa and Aquiminzaque, in 1539 and 1540 respectively. In 1542 Gonzalo Suárez Rendón finally put down the last resistance and the territories of the Confederations were shared by Belalcazar, Federmann, and De Quesada. Later the Spanish Crown would elect De Quesada as the man in charge, with the title adelantado de los cabildos de Santa Fe y Tunja.

Last Muisca sovereigns

Under the colonial regime 

When the Muisca structure disappeared under the Spanish Conquest, the territory of the Confederations of the zaque and zipa were included in a new political division within the Spanish colonies in America. The territory of the Muisca, located in a fertile plain of the Colombian Andes that contributed to make one of the most advanced South American civilizations, became part of the colonial region named Nuevo Reino de Granada. The priests and nobility of the Muisca were eliminated. Only the Capitanias remained. Much information about the Muisca culture was gathered by the Spanish administration and by authors such as Pedro de Aguado and Lucas Fernández de Piedrahita. The Spaniards created indigenous areas to keep the survivors, who were obligated to work the land for them under the quasi-genocidal encomienda system. The colonial era contributed to the importance of Bogotá, and people from the area would play an important role in the fights for independence and republican consolidation. The wars of independence of three nations (Colombia with Panamá, Venezuela, and Ecuador) were led by the descendants of aboriginals; Spaniard-affiliated elites were forcibly deported after independence.

Independent Colombia

20th century 
After independence in 1810, the new state dissolved many of the indigenous reservations. The one in Tocancipá was dissolved in 1940. The one in Sesquilé was reduced to 10% of its original size. Tenjo was reduced to 54% of its original size after 1934. The Reservation of Cota was re-established on land bought by the community in 1916, and then recognized by the 1991 constitution; the recognition was withdrawn in 1998 by the state and restored in 2006.

In 1948 the state forbade the production of chicha, a corn-based alcoholic drink. This was a blow to the culture and economy of the Muisca. The ban remained until 1991. Since then, the "Festival of the chicha, maize, life, and joy" is celebrated every year in Barrio La Perseverancia, a neighborhood in Bogotá where most of the chicha is produced.

21st century 

Since 1989, there has been a process of reconstruction of the indigenous councils by the surviving members of the Muisca Culture.  Muisca Councils currently working are Suba, Bosa, Cota, Chía, and Sesquilé. The councils had an Assembly in Bosa on 20–22 September 2002, called the First General Congress of the Muisca People. In that congress, they founded the Cabildo Mayor del Pueblo Muisca, affiliated to the National Indigenous Organization of Colombia (ONIC). They proposed linguistic and cultural recuperation, defense of the territories nowadays occupied by others, and proposed urban and tourist plans. They support the communities of Ubaté, Tocancipá, Soacha, Ráquira, and Tenjo in their efforts to recover their organizational and human rights.

The Muisca people of Suba opposed the drying up of the Tibabuyes wetland and wanted to recover the Juan Amarillo wetland. They defended the natural reserves like La Conejera, part of the Suba Hills that is considered by the Shelter's Council to be communal land. Suati Magazine (The Song of the Sun) is a publication of poetry, literature, and essays about Muisca culture.

The community of Bosa made important achievements in its project of natural medicine in association with the Paul VI Hospital and the District Secretary of Health of Bogotá. The community of Cota has reintroduced the growing of quinua, and regularly barter their products at market.

Toward the end of 2006 there was a report on the Muisca population:

 Three Muisca councils: Cota, Chía, and Sesquilé, with a population of 2,318 persons
 in the Capital District 5,186 people are registered as belonging to the Muisca ethnic group
 in the localities of Suba and Bosa, 1,573 people are registered
 the report does not include the number of people of the Muisca ethnic group in the entire territory of the ancient Muisca Confederation or outside that territory. It does not include Muisca Creole persons, it is to say, those of mixed Muisca ancestry.

Muisca research 

Studies of Muisca culture are abundant and have a long tradition. The first sources come from the Chronicles of the West Indies, which work lasted for three centuries during the existence of the colonial New Kingdom of Granada.

After the independence wars in 1810, there was a surge of interest in the study of the Muisca culture. Indigenous Colombians established the capital of their republic in Bogotá, the former viceroyal city, which was the capital of the confederation of the zipa, and was known as Bacatá. Research shows that this site was the cradle of an advanced society whose process of consolidation was cut short by the Spanish conquest.

This search for an identity resulted in giving emphasis to the Muisca culture and overlooking other native nations, which were seen as wild people. Researchers wrongly concluded that the Muisca culture inhabited a previously empty land and that all archeological finds could be attributed solely to the Muisca. In 1849 president Tomás Cipriano de Mosquera invited Italian cartographer Agustín Codazzi, who led the Geography Commission with Manuel Ancízar and did descriptive studies of the national territory and an inventory of the archaeological sites. The result of the expedition was published in Bogotá in 1889 as Peregrinación Alfa. Argüello García pointed out that the goal of that expedition in the context of the new nation was to underline the pre-Hispanic societies and in that sense, they centered on the Muisca culture as the main model. A similar tendency can be found in the works of Ezequiel Uricoechea. An objection to that point of view came from Vicente Restrepo: his work Los chibchas antes de la conquista española showed them as barbarians.

Miguel Triana, in his work La Civilización Chibcha suggested that the rock art symbols were writing. Wenceslao Cabrera Ortíz was the one who concluded that the Muisca were migrants to the highlands; in 1969 he published on this and reported about excavations at the El Abra archaeological site. Those publications opened a new era in the studies of the pre-Hispanic cultures in Colombia.

Recent archaeological work has also concentrated on the creation and composition of Muisca goldwork, with this data being made available for wider research.

Named after the Muisca and their culture 

Several (fossil) flora and fauna found in Colombia in the area of the Muisca have been named after the people. Two volcanoes on Jupiter's moon Io have been named after the Muisca religion and mythology.

See also 

 Spanish conquest
 Aztec, Maya, Muzo
 New Kingdom of Granada, indigenous peoples in Colombia
 Panche, Achagua, Guane, Guayupe, Lache, Tegua

References

Bibliography 
 
 
  Université de Montréal.

Further reading 
 
 

 Friede, Juan 1961: Los chibchas bajo la dominación española (tr.en. The Chibcha People under the Spaniard Rule). Bogotá: La Carreta

 González de Pérez, María Stella 1987: Diccionario y Gramática Chibcha (Chibchan Dictionary and Grammar). Manuscrito anónimo de la Biblioteca Nacional de Colombia. Bogotá: Instituto Caro y Cuervo
 Enciclopedia de Colombia a su alcance Espasa Siglo (Colombian Encyclopedia within reach – Espasa Century). Tomo 1 Bogotá, Colombia 2003
 Hernández Rodríguez Guillermo 1949: De los Chibchas a la Colonia y la República (tr.en. From the Chibcha People to the Colony to the Republic). Bogotá: Ediciones Paraninfo, 1991
 Historia de Colombia (tr.en. History of Colombia). Tomo 1 Zamora Editores, Bogotá, Colombia 2003
 Gran Enciclopedia de Colombia Tematica. Tomos 1 y 11 Círculo de Lectores, Bogotá, Colombia 1994
 Fundación Misión Colombia: Historia de Bogota, Conquista y Colonia. Tomo 1 Salvat-Villegas editores, Bogotá, Colombia 1989
 
 Londoño, Eduardo 1998: Los muiscas: una reseña histórica con base en las primeras descripciones. Bogotá: Museo del Oro
 Llano Restrepo, María Clara y Marcela Campuzano 1994: La Chicha, una bebida fermentada a través de la historia. Bogotá: Instituto Colombiano de Antropología
 
 
 
 
 Tovar Pinzón, Hermes 1980: La formación social chibcha. Bogotá. CIEC

External links 

 The Art of Pre-Columbian Gold: The Jan Mitchell Collection – The Metropolitan Museum of Art exhibition catalog – available online as PDF
 Muisca Indigenous Heritage – development cooperation story of the Wikibook  Development Cooperation Handbook
 Muisca: "Chibchan Indians" – Online Books Page
 Books on the Muisca – Ibero-American Institute – Berlin
  Nicely animated video about the Muisca and their religious origin
  Animated video about the Spanish conquest of the Muisca – Tisquesusa, Quemuenchatocha and Aquiminzaque
 
 

 
Pre-Columbian cultures
Indigenous culture of the Americas
Indigenous peoples in Colombia
Colombian culture
Articles containing video clips